Henrich R. Greve (born 1 January 1966) is a Norwegian organizational theorist, and Professor of Entrepreneurship at INSEAD, and the Rudolf and Valeria Maag Chair in Entrepreneurship. He was the editor of the Administrative Science Quarterly.

Career 
Born in Stavanger, Norway, Greve received his Siviløkonom degree (B.A. in economics and business) from the Norwegian School of Economics in 1989. He continued to study in the United States at Stanford University, where in 1993, he received his MA in sociology. The next year, in 1994, he also received his PhD with a thesis entitled Patterns of Competition: The Diffusion of Adoption and Abandonment of Radio Broadcasting Strategies under supervision of James G. March.

Greve started his academic career at the University of Tsukuba in Japan in 1995 as assistant professor in the Institute of Policy and Planning Science, where in 1998 he became associate professor. In 2002, he moved back to Norway, where he was appointed as professor at the Norwegian School of Management. In 2007, he moved to INSEAD, where he became professor of entrepreneurship and chair in organization and management theory.

Greve's research interests are in the field of causes and consequences of strategic change in organizations, but he also studies organizational innovations, organizational founding and growth in young industries, and organizational network.

Publications 
Greve has authored and co-authored numerous publications in his field of expertise. Selected books:
 Greve, Henrich R. Organizational learning from performance feedback: A behavioral perspective on innovation and change. Cambridge University Press, 2003.
 Greve, Henrich R., Tim Rowley, and Andrew Shipilov. Network Advantage: How to Unlock Value from your Alliances and Partnerships. Jossey-Bass, 2013.
 Audia, Pino G. and Henrich R. Greve. Organizational Learning from Performance and Aspirations: A Behavioral Perspective on Multiple Goals, 2021.

Selected articles:
 Barnett, William P., Henrich R. Greve, and Douglas Y. Park. "An evolutionary model of organizational performance." Strategic Management Journal 15.S1 (1994): 11-28.
 Greve, Henrich R. "Performance, Aspirations and Risky Organizational Change." Administrative Science Quarterly. 43(March) (1998): 58-86.
 Davis, Gerald F., and Henrich R. Greve. "Corporate elite networks and governance changes in the 1980s." American Journal of Sociology 103.1 (1997): 1-37.
 Greve, Henrich R. "A behavioral theory of R&D expenditures and innovations: Evidence from shipbuilding." Academy of Management Journal 46.6 (2003): 685-702.
 Brass, D. J., Galaskiewicz, J., Greve, H. R., & Tsai, W. (2004). "Taking stock of networks and organizations: A multilevel perspective". Academy of management journal, 47(6), 795-817.

See also 
Organizational learning
Organizational ecology
Diffusion of innovations

References

External links 
 http://www.insead.edu/facultyresearch/faculty/profiles/hgreve/ Vita Page at INSEAD
 http://henrichgreve.com/ Personal Homepage

1966 births
Living people
People from Stavanger
Norwegian business theorists
Norwegian School of Economics alumni
Stanford University alumni
Academic staff of BI Norwegian Business School
Academic staff of INSEAD
Norwegian expatriates in the United States
Norwegian expatriates in Japan
Norwegian expatriates in Singapore